The grey-hooded bush tanager (Cnemoscopus rubrirostris) is a species of South American bird in the tanager family Thraupidae.  It is the only member of the genus Cnemoscopus.
It is found in Bolivia, Colombia, Ecuador, Peru, and Venezuela.
Its natural habitat is subtropical or tropical moist montane forests.

Taxonomy
The grey-hooded bush tanager was formally described in 1840 by the French ornithologist Frédéric de Lafresnaye from a sample collected near Bogotá in Colombia. He coined the binomial name Arremon rubrirostris. The grey-hooded bush tanager is now the only species placed in the genus Cnemoscopus that was introduced in 1919 by the American ornithologists Outram Bangs and Thomas Penard. The genus name combines the Ancient Greek knēmos meaning "mountain-slope" with skopos meaning "searcher" or "watcher". The specific epithet rubrirostris combines the Latin ruber meaning "red" with -rostris meaning "billed".

Two subspecies are recognised:
 C. r. rubrirostris (Lafresnaye, 1840 – west Venezuela and north-central Colombia to Ecuador
 C. r. chrysogaster (Taczanowski, 1875) – north Peru to west Bolivia

References

External links
 Xeno-canto: audio recordings of the grey-hooded bush tanager

Birds of the Northern Andes
grey-hooded bush tanager
Taxonomy articles created by Polbot